Min Razagri Aredaw Sadan, or more commonly known as Rakhine Razawin Haung, is an Arakanese (Rakhine) chronicle covering the history of Arakan.

References

Bibliography
 

Burmese chronicles